The 1990 Northwestern Wildcats team represented Northwestern University during the 1990 NCAA Division I-A football season. In their fifth year under head coach Francis Peay, the Wildcats compiled a 2–9 record (1–7 against Big Ten Conference opponents) and finished in last place in the Big Ten Conference.

The team's offensive leaders were quarterback Len Williams with 1,700 passing yards, Bob Christian with 939 rushing yards, and Richard Buchanan with 834 receiving yards.  Three Northwestern players received All-Big Ten honors in 1990: (1) wide receiver Richard Buchanan (AP-1); (2) defensive lineman Mel Agee (AP-1); and (3) defensive lineman Don Davey (AP-1).

Schedule

Roster

References

Northwestern
Northwestern Wildcats football seasons
Northwestern Wildcats football